Pernille Brandenborg (born 29 July 1997) is an Faroese-Danish handballer who plays for København Håndbold in the Danish Women's Handball League and the Faroe Islands women's national team.

On 22 January 2021, it was announced that Brandenborg had signed a 2-year contract with Randers HK, after three years in Vendsyssel Håndbold.

Brandenburg has been capped for the Faroe Islands national team, appearing for the team during the 2022 European Women's Handball Championship qualifying cycle. She made her debut on the Faroese national team on 2 December 2016, against Macedonia.

Achievements
Danish 1st Division:
Winner: 2019-20

References

1997 births
Living people
People from Svendborg Municipality
Faroese female handball players
Expatriate handball players
Sportspeople from the Region of Southern Denmark